Jules Harlow (born June 28, 1931) is a Conservative Jewish rabbi and liturgist; son of Henry and Lena Lipman Harlow. He was born in Sioux City, Iowa.

In 1952 at Morningside College in Sioux City he earned a B.A., and from there went to New York City to study in the Jewish Theological Seminary of America; here he became ordained as a rabbi in 1959. He then became a staff member of the Rabbinical Assembly (RA), the international organization of rabbis in Conservative Judaism.

He soon began work as a liturgist on the RA's prayerbook committee, working with Rabbi Gershon Hadas on new siddurim (Jewish prayerbooks) for use in Conservative congregations. Under the editorship of Rabbi Hadas, they succeeded in printing the widely used Weekday Prayer Book in 1961. He took a greater role by editing and translating the movement's mahzor (prayerbook for Rosh Hashanah and Yom Kippur) which was published in 1972. He soon became the chief liturgist for the Conservative movement, and was the editor in the groundbreaking Siddur Sim Shalom in 1985. Siddur Sim Shalom became the prototype for an entire family of later Conservative siddurim, including Siddur Sim Shalom for Shabbat and Yom Tov, Siddur Sim Shalom for Weekdays and Or Hadash: A Commentary on Siddur Sim Shalom. Among his many other important publishing activities within Conservative Judaism is his work as literary editor on the Etz Hayim: A Torah Commentary.

Rabbi Jules Harlow, together with his wife, Navah, has played a paramount role in the cause of the Bnei Anusim (descendants of crypto-Jews) in Lisbon, Portugal. Thanks to the Harlows' assistance in cooperation with Masorti Olami, the Bnei Anusim of Lisbon have been able to return to the Jewish faith, and a new congregation (Kehilat Beit Israel) has been founded in Lisbon, namely the first non-orthodox synagogue in the history of Portugal.

His son David Harlow is a lawyer and his daughter Ilana Harlow is a folklorist.

See also
 Conservative Judaism

References

External links
 Omaha World-Herald, Andrew J. Nelson 18 September 2008

1931 births
Living people
Morningside University alumni
Jewish Theological Seminary of America alumni
American Conservative rabbis
20th-century American rabbis
21st-century American rabbis